Benton Avenue AME Church is a historic African Methodist Episcopal church located at 830 N. Benton Avenue in Springfield, Greene County, Missouri, USA. It was built between 1922 and 1926, and is a two-story tile block and brick church.

It was listed on the National Register of Historic Places in 2001.

References

African-American history of Missouri
African Methodist Episcopal churches in Missouri
Churches on the National Register of Historic Places in Missouri
Churches completed in 1922
Churches in Springfield, Missouri
National Register of Historic Places in Greene County, Missouri